The 2013 Monterrey Open was a women's tennis tournament played on outdoor hard courts. It was the 5th edition of the Monterrey Open and an International tournament on the 2013 WTA Tour. It took place at the Sierra Madre Tennis Club in Monterrey, Mexico, from 1 to 7 April.

Singles main-draw entrants

Seeds

Rankings as of March 18, 2013.

Other entrants
The following players received wildcards into the main draw:
  Ximena Hermoso
  Ana Ivanovic
  Ana Sofía Sánchez

The following players received entry via qualifying:
  Jovana Jakšić
  Samantha Crawford
  Alla Kudryavtseva
  Tereza Mrdeža

Withdrawals
 Before the tournament
  Victoria Azarenka (right ankle injury)
  Kirsten Flipkens
  Bojana Jovanovski
  Anastasija Sevastova
  Aleksandra Wozniak (shoulder injury)
  Vera Zvonareva (shoulder injury)

Retirements
 During the tournament
  Kimiko Date-Krumm (low back injury)
  Olga Puchkova (respiratory illness)

Doubles main-draw entrants

Seeds 

 Rankings are as of March 18, 2013.

Other entrants 
The following pairs received wildcards into the doubles main draw:
  Daria Gavrilova /  Marcela Zacarías
  Ximena Hermoso /  Ana Sofía Sánchez

Withdrawals
 During the tournament
  CoCo Vandeweghe (gastrointestinal illness)

Champions

Singles

  Anastasia Pavlyuchenkova def.  Angelique Kerber, 4–6, 6–2, 6–4

Doubles

 Tímea Babos /  Kimiko Date-Krumm def.  Eva Birnerová /  Tamarine Tanasugarn, 6–1, 6–4

References

External links
Official website

Monterrey Open
Monterrey Open
Monterrey Open